Aislín McGuckin (born May 1974) is a Northern Irish actress. She has appeared in theatre, television, and film roles. Her early film work includes The Nephew and The White Countess. From 2014 to 2015, she starred as Letitia MacKenzie in the Starz series Outlander, and in 2020, played Marianne's mother, Denise, in the BBC One miniseries Normal People.

Early life
McGuckin was born in Enniskillen, Northern Ireland to parents Lorcan and Margaret. She grew up the eldest of three children in a Catholic family in Lurgan, County Armagh. She attended Sacred Heart Grammar School in Newry. She was going to study law at university, but changed her mind and instead pursued a degree in acting at Rose Bruford College in South East London.

Personal life
McGuckin met Aidan McArdle in London through a Royal Shakespeare Company production of Richard III. They married in 2004 and have three children, Mireille, Lorcan, and Senan. The family moved to Dublin in 2015. They divorced in 2019.

Filmography

Film

Television

Theatre credits

References

External links

1974 births
Living people
20th-century actresses from Northern Ireland
21st-century actresses from Northern Ireland
Alumni of Rose Bruford College
Film actresses from Northern Ireland
Television actresses from Northern Ireland
People from Enniskillen
People from Lurgan